Gordon Watson (born 2 March 1954) is a British antique dealer and television presenter, and "one of the world's leading authorities on 20th and 21st century design".

Watson was the only dealer to appear in all of the first four series of Channel 4's Four Rooms TV show. 
Since May 2016, he has his own series on BBC2, The Extraordinary Collector.

Watson lives and works in Chelsea, London.

References

External links
 

1954 births
British television presenters
Living people
People from Chelsea, London